Managers in the Nemzeti Bajnokság are involved in the day-to-day running of the team, including the training, team selection, and player acquisition. Their influence varies from club-to-club and is related to the ownership of the club and the relationship of the manager with fans. Managers are required to have a UEFA Pro Licence which is the final coaching qualification available, and follows the completion of the UEFA 'B' and 'A' Licences.The UEFA Pro Licence is required by every person who wishes to manage a club in the Nemzeti Bajnoksag on a permanent basis.

Current managers
As of 8 June 2018.

Winning managers
As of 25 April 2022

Notes
Note 1: For the seasons 1901, 1902 (won by Budapesti TC) 1903, 1906–07, 1908–09, 1909–10, 1910–11, 1911–12, 1912–13 (won by Ferencváros) managers are not included in the ranking since they are unknown.
Note 2: Active managers are in bold.

References 

Hungary